The 2021 Atlantic Hockey Tournament was the 17th edition of the Atlantic Hockey Tournament. It was played between March 8 and March 20, 2021 entirely at home campus locations. On March 5, 2021, Holy Cross withdrew from the tournament due to a positive COVID test. This resulted in Sacred Heart receiving a bye into the quarterfinal round. First Round and Quarterfinal games took place at home venues while Semifinal a Championship games were held at the MassMutual Center, the home of American International. By winning the tournament, American International earned Atlantic Hockey's automatic bid to the 2021 NCAA Division I Men's Ice Hockey Tournament.

Format
The tournament featured four rounds of play. The tournament participants were split into east- and west-brackets. In the first round, after the withdrawal of Holy Cross, the two lowest-seeded teams from each region, as determined by the conference regular season standings, played a single game with the winners advancing to the quarterfinals. The top six teams from the conference regular season standings received byes to the quarterfinals. There, the first seed from each region and the winner of the first round game of the same region and the second and the third seeds of each region will play single-elimination games, with the winners advancing to the semifinals. In the semifinals, the highest remaining seed of each region will play the lower remaining seed of the opposite region in single games, with the winners advancing to the championship game. The tournament champion will receive an automatic bid to the 2021 NCAA Division I Men's Ice Hockey Tournament.

Conference standings

Bracket
Teams are reseeded for the semifinals

Note: * denotes overtime period(s)

Results

First round

(W4) Mercyhurst vs. (W5) Niagara

(E4) Bentley vs. (E5) Air Force

Quarterfinals

(E1) American International vs. (E4) Bentley
Bentley withdrew from the tournament due to an increase of COVID-19 positive tests on campus. American International received a bye into the semifinal round.

(E2) Army vs. (E3) Sacred Heart

(W1) Robert Morris vs. (W5) Niagara

(W2) Canisius vs. (W3) RIT

Semifinals

(E1) American International vs. (W5) Niagara

(E2) Army vs. (W2) Canisius

Championship

(E1) American International vs. (W2) Canisius

Tournament awards

All-Tournament Team
G: Stefano Durante (American International)
D: Logan Gestro (Canisius)
D: Brennan Kapcheck (American International)
F: Elijiah Barriga (American International)
F: Justin Cole* (American International)
F: J. D. Pogue (Canisius)

* Most Valuable Player(s)

References

Atlantic Hockey Tournament
Atlantic Hockey Tournament
Atlantic Hockey Tournament